Lynn Snodgrass (née Lynn Dee Grenz, born c. 1951) is a politician in the U.S. state of Oregon. She served in the Oregon House of Representatives. A Republican, she was elected Speaker in 1998, succeeding fellow Republican Lynn Lundquist. At the time, many Republicans felt Lundquist was too accommodating to Democratic Governor John Kitzhaber. Snodgrass was the first Portland-area Speaker since Vera Katz, whose term in that position ended in 1991.

Early life
Snodgrass was born in Oregon, growing up in Milwaukie. She attended Oregon State University, and earned an elementary teaching degree at Portland State University. She competed for the Miss Oregon crown in 1969, losing to Margie Elaine Huhta. She competed again, and was crowned Miss Oregon in 1971. She married Drake Snodgrass in 1974. , they owned a successful local nursery and landscaping company. They moved to Boring, Oregon in the early 1980s. She held a seat on the Damascus school board, and served on Portland's Metro Home Builder Association. (Drake's family owned the $15 million business 7 Dees Nursery.)

Political career
Snodgrass' political involvement began when a bill advanced by then-Speaker Larry Campbell forced Boring's school district to merge with that of neighboring Gresham. Snodgrass was enraged by that and her daughter's increasing class size, and made her first run for the legislature in 1994, which she won.

She represented District 10, which included her home town of Boring as well as Clackamas, Happy Valley, Damascus, South Gresham, Estacada, and portions of Oregon City. It straddled Portland's urban growth boundary. She ascended quickly in the ranks of the Oregon House, as a result of the term limits that were in place in the late 1990s.

Snodgrass was chosen Republican majority leader for the 1997 session. In 1998 Snodgrass defeated Democratic challenger Mike Smith, who got only 35% of the vote.

She supported sending the then-recently approved Oregon Death with Dignity Act back to voters, and pushed for a bill to recriminalize marijuana. She supported Senate Bill 600, an early version of Measure 37, and a bill requested by the Associated Oregon Industries that would have limited student activity fees for political purposes. The Oregon League of Conservation Voters asserted that she cast environmentally-friendly votes 7 percent of the time in the 1997 session, and 0% in 1995. She led the campaign to send Measure 65 to the voters in 1997.

She drew support from the Oregon Right to Life PAC and the NRA.

She is a deeply religious woman, and holds early-morning bible studies in her home. She occasionally sang hymns with fellow legislator Margaret Carter. (Carter considered Snodgrass a close friend, but worried in 1998 that her social agenda would undermine important social services.)

Snodgrass tried to pass a law in 1997 that would have established April as "Christian Heritage Month."

A 1998 Willamette Week article questioned the accuracy of Snodgrass's understanding of how tax laws affected urban and rural school funding. The article asserted that Measure 5 of 1990 impacted Portland schools negatively, while benefitting schools like those in Snodgrass's district; and contrasted that fact with Snodgrass's assertion that her district's schools had suffered while Portland schools did not.

Kate Brown was elected Senate Minority Leader in the same year. Fellow Representative Chris Beck, a Democrat, noted that Snodgrass was the first Portland-area speaker in over 10 years, and expressed hope that she would rise above partisan politics and help solve the problems of Portland. Snodgrass was noted for strongly supporting an openly gay candidate for the House, Chuck Carpenter, over a more religious and conservative Republican (Bill Witt, who went on to win the election). She had a contentious relationship with her predecessor, Lynn Lundquist, over education funding.

Snodgrass ran unsuccessfully for Oregon Secretary of State in 2000. She was defeated by Democrat Bill Bradbury.

Lynn currently holds the Gresham Area Chamber of Commerce and Visitors Center, CEO position.

See also 
 List of female speakers of legislatures in the United States

References 

1950s births
Living people
Miss America 1970s delegates
Miss Oregon winners
Oregon State University alumni
People from Milwaukie, Oregon
School board members in Oregon
Speakers of the Oregon House of Representatives
Republican Party members of the Oregon House of Representatives
Women state legislators in Oregon
Women legislative speakers
20th-century American people
21st-century American women